Volleyball at the 1980 Summer Olympics was represented by two events. It was held at the Minor Arena of the Central Lenin Stadium and at the Druzhba (Friendship) Multi-Purpose Arena of the Central Lenin Stadium, both located at Luzhniki (south-western part of Moscow). The schedule started on July 20 and ended on August 1.

Medal table

Medal summary

References

External links
Official Olympic Report

 
1980 Summer Olympics events
O
1980
International volleyball competitions hosted by the Soviet Union